The 2019 Veterans World Wrestling Championships was held from 8 to 13 October 2019 in Tbilisi, Georgia.

The competition was held in the following age categories:
 Division " A " 35 – 40 years
 Division " B " 41 – 45 years
 Division " C " 46 – 50 years
 Division " D " 51 – 55 years
 Division " E " 56 – 60 years
 
The weight categories are as follows:
55 – 62 kg 
70 kg 
78 kg 
88 kg 
100 kg 
100 – 130 kg

Medal table

Medal summary

Men's freestyle

Veterans A

Veterans B

Veterans C

Veterans D

Veterans E

Men's Greco-Roman

Veterans A

Veterans B

Veterans C

Veterans D

Veterans E

References

Veterans World Wrestling Championships